Bullatacin is a bis(tetrahydrofuranoid) fatty acid lactone found in some fruits from Annonaceae family. It is a member of the class of compounds known as acetogenins.

References 

Furanones
Tetrahydrofurans
Secondary alcohols
Polyketides
NADH dehydrogenase inhibitors